George Patrick Huntley (13 July 1868 – 21 September 1927), always billed as G. P. Huntley, was an Irish actor, known for comic performances in the theatre and the music halls.

Life and career
Huntley was born into a theatrical family in Fermoy, County Cork.  He made his stage debut at the age of six as Pike Rich in Under the Gaslight, and toured for some years with the theatrical troupe of his father, Frank Huntley. Moving to England, Huntley played in melodramas in London and on tour. From 1882 to 1885, he played at the Adelphi Theatre, then at the Theatre Royal, Drury Lane in both drama and comedy. He joined the company of William and Madge Kendal, and went with them to New York in 1891. He remained with the Kendals for four years, in London and on three further US visits.

In 1901 he had his first major success in the West End, playing a "knut" role, Lord Plantagenet, in the Edwardian musical comedy Kitty Grey. In the view of The Times, other roles for which he was particularly celebrated were Lord Cheyne in Three Little Maids (1902), Sir Ormesby St-Leger in The School Girl (1903), and Mr Hook in Miss Hook of Holland (1908). In 1905 he played the Doctor in Passion, Poison, and Petrifaction. Other roles in musicals included Sir Titus in The Circus Girl (1897), A Runaway Girl (1899), Trooper Smith in Lady Madcap (1904), the title characters in Mr. Popple of Ippleton (1905) and The Hon'ble Phil (1908), Victor in My Mimosa Maid (1908), and Lord Playne in Betty (1915). In the music halls he worked with his wife, Eva Kelly, in comic sketches, such as "Buying a Gun", "Selling a Pup" and "The Fairy Glen Laundry". 

He was almost as well known in the US as in the UK, making regular Broadway appearances before and after the First World War, including the New York runs of some of his musicals, as well as Eccles in the play Caste (1910), Hitchy-Koo of 1920, Sir George in The Second Mrs. Tanqueray (1924) and Sir Francis in a 1926 adaptation of Gentlemen Prefer Blondes.

Huntley died in London. He was the father of film actor G. P. Huntley Jr.

Notes

References

External links

Photo of Huntley and Kelly touring the US in Kitty Grey

1868 births
1927 deaths
English male stage actors